Terminator Genisys: Music from the Motion Picture is the soundtrack album composed by Lorne Balfe for the 2015 film of the same name, directed by Alan Taylor, which is the sixth instalment and a reboot of the Terminator franchise, taking the premise of the original film. The album was initially set to be scored by Christophe Beck, before Balfe replaced him. Hans Zimmer served as the executive producer of the film's soundtrack. The album, featured 22 tracks, and was released on June 17, 2015 under the Skydance Media and Paramount Music labels.

Development
During December 2014, Christophe Beck was initially hired to score the film. However, Lorne Balfe replaced Beck as the composer in March 2015. Balfe wanted to create a standalone soundtrack for the film as Terminator Genisys is neither a prequel, nor a sequel. However, he wanted to incorporate Brad Fiedel's iconic theme in The Terminator, as he wanted to "have a nod to the past, but also bring it into the future." While speaking about its resemblance to the previous instalments, Balfe said "There’s something about it being organic and manipulating it with the sounds. This is a different kind of Terminator and each film has been different.  It’s not meant to sound strictly like a Terminator score. There are scenes which are identical to the original and musically I did it exactly the same. I scored it as close as I could possibly get it."

Balfe called it as a hybrid score and though there are massive action cues, the score also featured few emotional cues as "the score needed to be much more personal to match the progression of the movie’s character development and convey the relationship between Sarah Connor and the Terminator", while Balfe spent more time, which became "Fate and Hope". He also created few themes for John Connor, and the romantic relationship between Kyle and Sarah, while also scored the "Terminator" theme with the piano and three notes for the film.

Songs 
Chinese pop singer Jane Zhang and hip hop artist Big Sean contributed "Fighting Shadows", in both Zhang's first English-language recording and Big Sean's musical feature-film debut. It was released by Def Jam Recordings on July 3, 2015, as a soundtrack bonus track. A music video of the single, produced and directed by Robby Starbuck, included footage from the film. The Ramones' "I Wanna Be Sedated", OneRepublic's "Love Runs Out" and Inner Circle's "Bad Boys" are heard in the film, but not included in the soundtrack.

Track listing

Reception 
James Southall of Movie Wave wrote "Terminator Genisys has its moments but goes in one ear, out the other and is completely forgotten as soon as it’s over." Filmtracks.com wrote "Balfe's habit of substituting the film arrangement of important cues with his concept suites hurts this album, as the film versions of the "fate and hope" theme for the Reese trip back to 1984 and the John Connor theme for his own introduction needed to be featured in the proper place in the presentation. The composer should consider placing his concept suites at the start or end of his albums as well. The score was widely distributed digitally, but a very limited commercial pressing on CD became a top collectible within just a few months. Fans took heart in the leaking of 90 minutes of the score, including the pertinent missing cues, and these longer bootlegs circulated widely. In any of its forms, the score's recording is generally dynamic, the synthetic strings, trumpets, and other soloists featured well against the ensemble. Expect to be pleasantly surprised despite nagging spotting issues."

Credits 
Credits adapted from Allmusic

 Lorne Balfe – composer, producer, synth programming
 Hans Zimmer – executive producer, synth programming
 Jason Richmond – music co-ordinator
 Chuck Choi – technical score engineer
 Stephanie McNally – technical score engineer
 Òscar Senén – orchestration
 Patricia Sullivan – mastering
 Alan Meyerson – mixing
 Darren Leigh Purkiss – electronic music programming
 Christian Wenger – recording
 David Metzner – music editor

References 

2015 soundtrack albums
Albums recorded at AIR Studios
Terminator (franchise) mass media
Terminator (franchise)
Science fiction film soundtracks